Wawa Dam (also known as Montalban Dam) is a gravity dam constructed over the Marikina River in the municipality of Rodriguez in Rizal province, Philippines. It was built in 1909 during the American colonial era to provide the water needs for Manila. It used to be the only source of water for Manila until Angat Dam was built and Wawa was abandoned in 1968. Due to insufficiency of water supply for Metro Manila, there was a strong clamor to reuse the dam. The dam and surrounding area is currently protected as part of the Pamitinan Protected Landscape.

External links

 Cooling off at Wawa Dam
 Wawa Dam
 Wawa Dam pushed as alternative water source
 People flock to Wawa Dam to beat the summer heat

References

Dams in the Philippines
Dams completed in 1909
Gravity dams
Sierra Madre (Philippines)
Buildings and structures in Rodriguez, Rizal
Tourist attractions in Rizal